A list of films produced by the Bollywood film industry based in Mumbai in 1988:

Top-grossing films
The top five highest-grossing films at the Indian Box Office in 1988:

1988

List of released films

References

External links
 Bollywood films of 1988 at the Internet Movie Database

1988
Lists of 1988 films by country or language
Films, Bollywood